Love Made Me Do It may refer to:
Love Made Me Do It (album), a 2010 album by Elin Lanto
"Love Made Me Do It" (song), a 2018 song by Cheryl